The Tirari–Sturt stony desert is a deserts and xeric shrublands ecoregion in central Australia.

Location and description
The Tirari–Sturt stony desert ecoregion contains the gibber plains (desert pavement) and red sands of the large Sturt Stony Desert, the Tirari Desert to its southwest and the Flinders and Gawler Ranges to the south. The Tirari has more sand dunes than the Sturt Stony Desert and has also been the site of some important fossil findings. Towns of the ecoregion include the opal mining centre of Coober Pedy, famous for its underground dwellings. The climate is very hot with summer temperatures reaching 50 °C.

The region consists of the Stony Plains, Gawler, Flinders Lofty Block and the Broken Hill Complex bioregions of the Interim Biogeographic Regionalisation for Australia (IBRA).

Flora and fauna
As well as stony plain and sands there are areas of chenopod, mallee and mulga wooded scrubland. The region is home to a variety of wildlife that has adapted to the hot dry conditions including the wedge-tailed eagles, yellow-footed rock wallaby and western grey kangaroos of the Flinders Ranges.

The desert proper is uninhabitable and the environment there remains undamaged, while the greener fringe are used for sheep grazing.

Protected areas
10.34% of the ecoregion is in protected areas. Protected areas include:

 Bimbowrie Conservation Park
 Black Rock Conservation Park
 Bon Bon Station Conservation Reserve
 Boolcoomatta Conservation Reserve
 Buckaringa Private Nature Reserve
 Bunkers Conservation Reserve
 Caroona Creek Conservation Park
 Coongie Lakes Ramsar Site, Wetland of International Importance
 Danggali Wilderness Protection Area
 Ediacara Conservation Park
 Elliot Price Conservation Park
 Gawler Ranges National Park
 Hiltaba Nature Reserve
 Ikara-Flinders Ranges National Park
 Ironstone Hill Conservation Park
 Kanku-Breakaways Conservation Park
 Kati Thanda-Lake Eyre National Park
 Kinchega National Park
 Lake Frome Regional Reserve
 Lake Gairdner National Park
 Lake Gilles Conservation Park
 Lake Torrens National Park
 Mount Brown Conservation Park
 Mount Willoughby Indigenous Protected Area
 Munyaroo Conservation Park
 Mutawintji Nature Reserve
 Mutawintji National Park
 Nantawarrina Indigenous Protected Area
 Pandappa Conservation Park
 Pinkawillinie Conservation Park
 Pualco Range Conservation Park
 Red Banks Conservation Park
 Simpson Desert Regional Reserve
 Strzelecki Regional Reserve
 The Dutchmans Stern Conservation Park
 Upper Spencer Gulf Marine Park
 Vulkathunha-Gammon Ranges National Park
 Wabma Kadarbu Mound Springs Conservation Park
 Whyalla Conservation Park
 Winninowie Conservation Park
 Witchelina Nature Reserve
 Witjira National Park
 Yalpara Conservation Park
 Yappala Indigenous Protected Area
 Yellabinna Regional Reserve
 Yellabinna Wilderness Protection Area
 Yumbarra Conservation Park

References

Biogeography of the Northern Territory
Deserts of South Australia
Deserts and xeric shrublands
Ecoregions of South Australia
Ecoregions of New South Wales
Lake Eyre basin